A very-high-density cable interconnect (VHDCI) is a 68-pin connector that was introduced in the SPI-2 document of SCSI-3. The VHDCI connector is a very small connector that allows placement of four wide SCSI connectors on the back of a single PCI card slot. Physically, it looks like a miniature Centronics type connector. It uses the regular 68-contact pin assignment. The male connector (plug) is used on the cable and the female connector ("receptacle") on the device.

Other uses
Apart from the standardized use with the SCSI interface, several vendors have also used VHDCI connectors for other types of interfaces:

 Nvidia: for an external PCI Express 8-lane interconnect, and used in Quadro Plex VCS and in Quadro NVS 420 as a display port connector
 ATI Technologies: on the FireMV 2400 to convey two DVI and two VGA signals on a single connector, and ganging two of these connectors side by side in order to allow the FireMV 2400 to be a low-profile quad display card. The Radeon X1950 XTX Crossfire Edition also used a pair of the connectors to grant more inter-card bandwidth than the PCI Express bus allowed at the time for Crossfire.
 AMD: Some Visiontek variants of the Radeon HD 7750 use a VHDCI connector alongside a Mini DisplayPort to allow a 5 (breakout to 4 HDMI+1 mDP) display Eyefinity array on a low profile card. VisionTek also released a similar Radeon HD 5570, though it lacked a Mini DisplayPort.
 Juniper Networks: for their 12- and 48-port 100Base-TX PICs (physical interface cards). The cable connects to the VHDCI connector on the PIC on one end, via an RJ-21 connector on the other end, to an RJ-45 patch panel.
 Cisco: 3750 StackWise stacking cables
 National Instruments: on their high-speed digital I/O cards.
 AudioScience uses VHDCI to carry multiple analog balanced audio and digital AES/EBU audio streams, and clock and GPIO signals.

See also
SCSI connector

References

Electrical signal connectors
Analog video connectors
Digital display connectors
Networking hardware
SCSI